The Flag of Los Lagos Region is one of the regional symbols of the Chilean Los Lagos Region. The flag was adopted in 2013 by the Regional Government.

The flag consists of a horizontal bicolour of green and blue, with four stars resembling the shape of the Southern Cross in the canton. The stars represent the four provinces of the Los Lagos Region (Osorno, Llanquihue, Chiloé and Palena).

References

Los Lagos Region
Flags of Chile
Los Lagos